Neas Energy (NEAS) is an energy trading and management company. The company deals in electricity, gas, and certificates in the European energy markets.

History 
Neas Energy  was established in 1998 by four Danish energy supply companies; Aalborg Municipality's Electricity Supply Company: AKE Net, Nyfors Entreprise A/S, Frederikshavn Forsyning A/S, and Thy-Mors Energi Holding A/S. The company has since established an organization with expert capabilities in trading, risk management, and market management for both producers and consumers of energy, and engages in energy trading, energy production management, and portfolio management.

Neas Energy was fully acquired by British energy group Centrica plc. in 2016.

Business areas 
 Energy Trading
 Energy Production Management
 Balance Responsible Party
 Wind Power
 CHP
 Portfolio Management

References

External links 
NEAS official website www.neasenergy.com

Energy companies of Denmark
Companies based in Aalborg